The Kubo formula, named for Ryogo Kubo who first presented the formula in 1957, is an equation which expresses the linear response of an observable quantity due to a time-dependent perturbation.

Among numerous applications of the Kubo formula, one can calculate the charge and spin susceptibilities of systems of electrons in response to applied electric and magnetic fields.  Responses to external mechanical forces and vibrations can be calculated as well.

General Kubo formula
Consider a quantum system described by the (time independent) Hamiltonian . The expectation value of a physical quantity, described by the operator , can be evaluated as:
 

where  is the partition function. Suppose now that just above some time  an external perturbation is applied to the system.

However, one can again find the time evolution of the density matrix  rsp. of the partition function  to evaluate the expectation value of 

The time dependence of the states  is governed by the Schrödinger equation  which thus determines everything, corresponding of course to the Schrödinger picture. But since  is to be regarded as a small perturbation, it is convenient to now use instead the interaction picture representation,  in lowest nontrivial order. The time dependence in this representation is given by  where by definition  for all t and  it is: 

Thus one obtains the expectation value of  up to linear order in the perturbation.

The above expression is true for any kind of operators. (see also Second quantization)

See also
 Green–Kubo relations

References

Quantum mechanics